Do Detectives Think? or The Bodyguard is a 1927 silent comedy short film starring Stan Laurel and Oliver Hardy prior to their official billing as the duo Laurel and Hardy.

Production
Do Detectives Think? is most notable for featuring the comedians in their familiar garb of crumpled suits and bowler hats for the very first time, the standard costumes of detectives of the time.

Plot
A Judge (Finlayson) sentences a murderer, the Tipton Slasher (Noah Young), to death. The murderer vows revenge on the judge.

Following the escape of the condemned man, the judge engages a detective agency which sends its two least-skilled detectives (Laurel and Hardy) to protect him.

In a sequence that establishes their routine, their hats blow off and land in a cemetery. They are scared to retrieve them. Stan is scared of his own shadow, thinking it is another person. Meanwhile the Slasher is in the judge's house, taking on the role of a butler.

Hardy demonstrates his shooting skills to the judge, claiming his uncle was William Tell. He tries to shoot an apple from Laurel's head but destroys a nearby vase.

The judge's wife sees the butler with a huge knife and screams. He hides in a bedroom where Laurel and Hardy sit in bed together. The judge is having a bath. Laurel and Hardy overpower the Slasher but Hardy gets handcuffed instead of the Slasher.

The judge in a large white towel falls down he stairs and an odd mask jams on the back of his head. From the back he looks like a ghost and scares the Slasher. The police arrive and arrest the Slasher.

The sleuths, after many mishaps, manage to capture the murderer.

Cast

Homages
Canadian musician Nash the Slash chose his stage name based on the character in Do Detectives Think.

References

Do detectives think by Lordheath. Last updated on May 2, 2017.

External links
 
 
 
 

1927 films
1927 comedy films
American silent short films
American black-and-white films
American courtroom films
Films directed by Fred Guiol
Laurel and Hardy (film series)
Films with screenplays by H. M. Walker
1927 short films
American comedy short films
1920s American films
Silent American comedy films
Silent American drama films